John David Lumsden (15 December 1960 – 22 April 2016) was a Scottish footballer who played in the English Football League for Stoke City.

Career
Lumsden was born in Edinburgh and played for East Fife before joining English side Stoke City in 1979. He made just six appearances for the "Potters" in three seasons and after a failed trial with Doncaster Rovers he entered non league football with Leytonstone & Ilford.

Career statistics

References

External links

1960 births
2016 deaths
Scottish footballers
Stoke City F.C. players
English Football League players
Footballers from Edinburgh
Association football midfielders
East Fife F.C. players
Scottish Football League players
Redbridge Forest F.C. players